The Karlskirche in Kassel (also Oberneustädter Kirche) is a Protestant church built by Paul du Ry in 1710 for the local Huguenot community.

The church was the location of a hundred-day sound installation by John Cage in 1987.

References

Churches in Kassel
Churches completed in 1710
1710 establishments in the Holy Roman Empire
Protestant churches in Hesse